María Fernanda Ríos Villalta (born February 20, 1982), also known as Mafer Ríos, is an Ecuadorian actress, singer, model, and fashion designer.

Career

Beginnings and music
María Fernanda Ríos was born in Guayaquil on February 20, 1982. She studied ballet and attended the Danzas Jazz academy.

She studied medicine for three years at the Universidad Católica de Santiago de Guayaquil, after which she left to dedicate herself to the arts.

She began as a singer and dancer in technocumbia groups such as Leche y Chocolate (created by Sharon la Hechicera), Las Musas, and most famously Kandela & Son, which she joined with Jasú Montero, Jordana Doylet, Malena Fernández-Madrid, Carla Ramírez, and Diana Guerrero. She stayed with the group for a year, leaving after appearing on the program .

Television
After retiring from music, Ríos tried her luck on television, on the  youth program El Callejón. Shortly afterward, she moved to Gamavisión as presenter of the show business program Rojo Rosa.

She played Mariana on the TC Televisión telenovela Jocelito, starring , along with Roberto Manrique, who played her boyfriend.

Returning to Gamavisión, she appeared in Infiltrados, Buenos Muchachos, and the dancing competition Bailando por un sueño, where she finished second.

She moved to Ecuavisa in 2010, playing the character Selva Monina in the telenovela , starring . After its success, Ecuavisa created the spin-off comic series El Combo Amarillo, which Ríos remained with until its conclusion in 2016.

She played Juana Francisca Silva on the TC Televisión comedy series Los Hijos de Don Juan.

From 2018 to 2019, she starred in the biographical telenovela , playing the late singer in her adulthood until her death. In real life, Ríos had been very close to Hechicera since her time in the group Leche y Chocolate, recalling "I worked with Sharon. And then she was my boss and I learned things with her. Then I belonged to another group, then we were friends, and now I am the one who is playing her."

In 2021, she was a juror on the fifth season of Soy el mejor.

Fashion designer
Ríos made her debut as a fashion designer at Salinas Fashion Week 2014. She has a line of clothing sold under the brand MFR.

Controversies
As a juror on the fourth season of Ecuador's Got Talent in 2015, Ríos rebuked a 16-year-old contestant for being an atheist, advising that she would never be successful if she did not believe in God. The criticisms that emerged from various atheist associations had wide repercussions in the domestic and international press. Following comments made toward her via social networks, she answered her critics directly, which the program's producers considered to be inappropriate. She was dismissed from the jury, leaving her companions Wendy Vera, Paola Farías, and Fernando Villarroel to judge the semifinals.

Personal life

In July 2019, through her official Instagram account, she announced that she had married Colombian model Miguel Ángel Álvarez. However, approximately four months later she announced their separation. In December 2020, she confirmed on social media that their divorce was final.

Filmography

TV series and telenovelas

TV programs

References

External links
  

1982 births
21st-century Ecuadorian actresses
Cumbia musicians
Ecuadorian female models
21st-century Ecuadorian women singers
Ecuadorian telenovela actresses
Ecuadorian women television presenters
Living people
Women in Latin music